Splash! is a British television series that follows celebrities learning diving. The celebrities performed each week in front of a panel of judges and a live audience in an Olympic-size diving pool with the result each week partly determined by public vote. Gabby Logan and Vernon Kay presented the show, whilst Team GB Olympic Gold Medal-winning diver Tom Daley was the expert mentor to the celebrities. It was filmed at the Inspire: Luton Sports Village, which is based in Stopsley, Luton. The show premiered on ITV on 5 January 2013 winning the ratings battle for its 7:15–8:15 p.m. slot with an average audience of 5.6 million viewers, a network share of 23.6%, however, it was cancelled on 24 June 2014 after just two series.

The format for the show originated from the Celebrity Splash! franchise created by television production company Eyeworks in the Netherlands, and was broadcast on SBS 6 as Sterren Springen Op Zaterdag (Celebrities Jumping on Saturday).

Format

The show was broadcast live on ITV on Saturday evenings, and was presented by Gabby Logan and Vernon Kay. In the show celebrities competed against each other performing dives in order to impress a judging panel and the viewing public. The series consisted of heats where two celebrities from each go into the semi finals, and then followed by a live final on successive Saturdays.

Series overview
Two series were broadcast, as summarised below.

Main series results

Series 1 (2013)

The first series began airing on 5 January 2013 and ran for 5 weeks ending on 2 February 2013.

The contestants for the first series were:

Series 2 (2014)

On 4 February 2013, a second series was confirmed and began airing on 4 January 2014 and ran for 7 weeks ending on 15 February 2014.

The contestants for the second series were:

Reception
The show received generally poor reviews from critics after its premiere, including "utterly awful", "a new low for television" and "probably the worst programme ever screened in primetime". Despite the critical drubbing, however, it achieved reasonable ratings and was recommissioned for a second series, before being cancelled in 2014.

Concern was shown for Daley's role in the show by the head of British Swimming David Sparkes, who claimed that he is in danger of putting his media work before his sporting career, and possibly hampering his chances of a gold medal at the 2016 Rio Olympic Games. Andy Banks, Daley's coach at Plymouth Diving and British Swimming and judge on the show, hit back at Sparkes' criticism airing his concerns that such negative comments might take the fun out of diving for Daley and indeed drive him away from the sport altogether to pursue his media career. Daley eventually won a bronze medal in the men's synchronized platform dive in the 2016 Games.

Heat 3 contestant Tina Malone made negative comments in an interview with Liverpool radio station Juice FM several days before her appearance on the show. She called this and other reality shows "garbage" as well as stating that "It’s the big fat cheques that make me happy" in reference to the fact she appears in such TV shows only for the financial reward.

International versions

A US version, under the title Splash, premiered on 19 March 2013 from the Riverside Aquatics Complex at Riverside City College and Pasadena's Rose Bowl Aquatics Center on ABC television. The US version features 2012 Olympic 10 m diving champion David Boudia and American diving legend Greg Louganis as judges. The Seven Network in Australia have also commissioned Celebrity Splash! which aired in 2013.
In 2015, a Lithuanian version of the show, called Šuolis, premiered on TV3.

References

External links
 .

2010s British reality television series
2013 British television series debuts
2014 British television series endings
British sports television series
British television series based on Dutch television series
English-language television shows
ITV reality television shows
Television series by ITV Studios